2022–23 Syed Mushtaq Ali Trophy was the fifteenth edition of Syed Mushtaq Ali Trophy, a Twenty20 competition that is played in India. It started on 11 October 2022 and the final was held on 5 November 2022. The tournament was a part of the 2022–23 Indian domestic cricket season, which was announced by the Board of Control for Cricket in India (BCCI) in August 2022. Tamil Nadu were the defending champions.

The tournament was divided into five groups, with eight teams in Groups A, B, and C, and seven teams in Groups D and E. The winners of each group progressed directly to the quarter-finals, while the second-placed team in each group and the third-placed team with the best record across the five groups qualified for the preliminary quarter-finals. The tournament was played in six cities across the country, with Indore, Jaipur, Lucknow, Mohali, and Rajkot hosting the group stage, and Kolkata hosting all of the knockout matches.

On 11 October, following the introduction of the Impact Player rule, Delhi's Hrithik Shokeen was the first utilised impact player, replacing Hiten Dalal in their match against Manipur.

In the final, Mumbai beat Himachal Pradesh by four wickets to win their first title.

New Rules

Impact Player
Along with the starting XI, teams would name four substitutes in their team sheet at the toss, and use one of the four during the match.
The player can replace any member of the starting XI at any point before the end of the 14th over of either innings, and would be able to bat and bowl his full allotment of overs.
The tactical scope of the Impact Player rule is vast, with no real restriction on the role he can play. For example, the Impact Player can replace a batter who has already been dismissed, and still get to bat - as long as the team only uses 11 batters or he could replace a bowler who has already sent down a few overs and still get to bowl his full four-over quota.

Player transfers
The following player transfers were approved ahead of the season.

League stage

Group A

Group B

Group C

Group D

Group E

Knockout stage

Preliminary quarter-finals

Quarter-finals

Semi-finals

Final

References

External links
 Series home at ESPN Cricinfo

Syed Mushtaq Ali Trophy
Syed Mushtaq Ali Trophy